The following is a list of massacres that have occurred in South Korea.

References

See also
Korean War
List of massacres in North Korea
Truth and Reconciliation Commission (South Korea)

South Korea
Massacres

Massacres